The 2012 NHK Trophy was the final event of six in the 2012–13 ISU Grand Prix of Figure Skating, a senior-level international invitational competition series. It was held at the Sekisui Heim Super Arena in Miyagi on November 22–25. Medals were awarded in the disciplines of men's singles, ladies' singles, pair skating, and ice dancing. Skaters earned points toward qualifying for the 2012–13 Grand Prix Final.

Eligibility
Skaters who reached the age of 14 by July 1, 2012 were eligible to compete on the senior Grand Prix circuit.

Prior to competing in a Grand Prix event, skaters were required to have earned the following scores (3/5 of the top scores at the 2012 World Championships):

Entries
The entries were as follows.

Withdrawals included Mary Beth Marley / Rockne Brubaker of the United States due to the end of their partnership, Japan's Narumi Takahashi / Mervin Tran in order to undergo surgery on Takahashi's repeatedly dislocating shoulder, China's Sui Wenjing / Han Cong due to an injury to Sui, Russia's Polina Shelepen due to worsening of a long-standing ankle injury (she was replaced by the United States' Mirai Nagasu), the United States' Alissa Czisny to continue her recovery from surgery, Caitlin Yankowskas / Joshua Reagan due to Reagan's rib injury, and Germany's Mari Vartmann / Aaron Van Cleave due to Van Cleave's broken cheekbone.

Overview
The competition took place in Miyagi, one of the regions severely affected by the 2011 Tōhoku earthquake and tsunami, with the arena used as a temporary morgue. The Japan Skating Federation said it selected the location to "send a message about our recovery, in response to support from around the world." Moderate tremors occurred during the weekend of the event but did not affect the competition.

Skating in his hometown, Japan's Yuzuru Hanyu won the men's short program with a world record score of 95.32 points – slightly surpassing the record he set at the 2012 Skate America (95.07) – while his teammate Daisuke Takahashi and Spain's Javier Fernández rounded out the top three. Daisuke Murakami attempted to continue after partially dislocating his right shoulder in a fall but eventually withdrew. In the free skating, Hanyu maintained his lead and won the second GP gold medal of his career, Takahashi took silver, and the United States' Ross Miner rose from fourth after the short to take the bronze.

Japan's Mao Asada won the ladies' short program ahead of the United States' Mirai Nagasu and China's Li Zijun. Akiko Suzuki of Japan won the free skating by over nine points and finished with the silver medal, Asada was second in the segment but finished first overall by 0.05 points, and Nagasu took the bronze.

Meryl Davis / Charlie White of the United States placed first in the short dance, followed by their teammates Maia Shibutani / Alex Shibutani and Russia's Elena Ilinykh / Nikita Katsalapov. Ilinykh fell ill with food poisoning before the free dance. Davis / White also placed first in the free dance and won the gold medal, Ilinykh / Katsalapov the silver, and the Shibutanis the bronze.

Russia's Vera Bazarova / Yuri Larionov won the pairs' short program, slightly ahead of Canada's Kirsten Moore-Towers / Dylan Moscovitch, with the United States' Marissa Castelli / Simon Shnapir in third. The top three remained the same after the free skating and Bazarova / Larionov won their first gold medal on the Grand Prix series.

Results

Men

Ladies

Pairs

Ice dancing

References

External links
 2012 NHK Trophy results
 Entries

NHK Trophy, 2012
NHK Trophy